Sir Marcus Alexander Smith (born 1 July 1967) is a British High Court judge.

Personal life and education 
Smith was educated at Balliol College, Oxford, completing a BA in 1988 and a BCL in 1990. He also attended the University of Munich.

In 1998, he married Louise Merrett, with whom he has one son and one daughter.

Career 
He was called to the bar at Lincoln's Inn in 1991 and practised commercial and regulatory law from Fountain Court Chambers, where he also completed his pupillage. From 1991 to 1994, he was a lecturer in law at Balliol. In addition to practice, he wrote two textbooks: Private International Law of Reinsurance and Insurance with Raymond Cox QC and Louise Merrett (2006) and The Law of Assignment with Nico Leslie (2007, 3rd edition  2018).

He was a part-time Chair of the Competition Appeal Tribunal in 2009 and was appointed King's Counsel in 2010.

High Court appointment 
On 12 January 2017, he was appointed as a High Court judge and assigned to the Chancery Division. He received his customary Knight Bachelor in the same year.

He is on the Financial List, the Patents Court, the Upper Tribunal (Tax and Chancery) and the Administrative Court. From 2019 to 2021, he was the Business and Property Courts Supervising Judge for the Midlands and Western circuit. In November 2021, he was appointed President of the Competition Appeals Tribunal.

References 

Living people
1967 births
21st-century English judges
Knights Bachelor
Alumni of Balliol College, Oxford
Members of Lincoln's Inn
Chancery Division judges
English King's Counsel
21st-century King's Counsel